Wah Sum Estate is a public housing estate in Wo Hop Shek, Fanling, New Territories, Hong Kong, near Flora Plaza and Wo Hing Sports Centre. It consists of two residential buildings built in 1995.

King Shing Court is a Home Ownership Scheme court in Wo Hop Shek, near Flora Plaza and Wah Sum Estate. It consists of four residential buildings built in 1995.

Houses

Wah Sum Estate

King Shing Court

Demographics
According to the 2016 by-census, Wah Sum Estate had a population of 4,588 while King Shing Court had a population of 6,804. Altogether the population amounts to 11,392.

Politics
Wah Sum Estate and King Shing Court are located in Wah Do constituency of the North District Council. It is currently represented by Cheung Chun-wai, who was elected in the 2019 elections.

See also

Public housing estates in Fanling

References

Residential buildings completed in 1995
Wo Hop Shek
Public housing estates in Hong Kong